Hilda Ceballos Llerenas (born 22 February 1956) is a Mexican politician from the Institutional Revolutionary Party. From 2009 to 2012 she served as Deputy of the LXI Legislature of the Mexican Congress representing Colima, and previously served in the Congress of Colima.

References

1956 births
Living people
Politicians from Colima
Women members of the Chamber of Deputies (Mexico)
Institutional Revolutionary Party politicians
21st-century Mexican politicians
21st-century Mexican women politicians
Members of the Congress of Colima
Deputies of the LXI Legislature of Mexico
Members of the Chamber of Deputies (Mexico) for Colima
Members of the Senate of the Republic (Mexico) for Colima
Women members of the Senate of the Republic (Mexico)